The following is a list of notable deaths in May 2007.

Entries for each day are listed alphabetically by surname. A typical entry lists information in the following sequence:
 Name, age, country of citizenship at birth, subsequent country of citizenship (if applicable), reason for notability, cause of death (if known), and reference.

May 2007

1
Wiley Harker, 92, American actor.
Winifred Pennington, 91, British limnologist.
Mathilde Octavie Tafna, 112, Guadeloupean oldest living person of a French possession.

2
Phillip Carter, 44, British businessman, honorary VP of Chelsea F.C., helicopter crash.
Abdul Sabur Farid Kohistani, 54/55, Afghan legislator and Prime Minister (1992), assassination by gunshot.
Brad McGann, 43, New Zealand film director (In My Father's Den), cancer.

3
Alex Agase, 85, Iranian-born American football coach.
J. Robert Bradley, 87, American gospel singer, diabetes.
Leonard Eron, 87, American psychologist, congestive heart failure.
Pat O'Shea, 74, Irish writer.
Wally Schirra, 84, American astronaut in Mercury, Gemini, and Apollo projects, heart attack.
"Rose Tombe", Sudanese celebrity goat, asphyxiation.
Knock Yokoyama, 75, Japanese comedian and politician, throat cancer.
Mamadou Zaré, 42, Ivorian footballer.

4
Russell W. Kruse, 85, American auctioneer, stroke.
Jeremias Nguenha, Mozambican political musician who sang in Shangaan.
José Antonio Roca, 78, Mexican football player and manager.
Mamadou Zaré, 45, Ivorian soccer player and coach.

5
Prince Abdul-Majid bin Abdul-Aziz, c.64, Saudi politician, governor of Mecca.
José Aponte de la Torre, 65, Puerto Rican mayor, respiratory complications.
Tom Hutchinson, 65, American football wide receiver for the Cleveland Browns 1964 NFL champions.
Theodore Maiman, 79, American physicist who built the first laser, systemic mastocytosis.
Edwin H. Simmons, 85, American Marine Corps historian.
Gusti Wolf, 95, Austrian actress.
 John Zamet, 74, British periodontist.

6
Alvin Batiste, 74, American jazz musician, heart attack.
Carey Bell, 70, American blues harmonica player, heart failure.
Lesley Blanch, 102, British writer and fashion editor.
Enéas Carneiro, 68, Brazilian politician, leukemia.
Tamás Gábor, 75, Hungarian Olympic fencer.
Curtis Harrington, 80, American film director.
Đorđe Novković, 63, Croatian songwriter.
Bernard Weatherill, Baron Weatherill, 86, English Speaker of the British House of Commons (1983–1992), after short illness.

7
Isabella Blow, 48, British fashion journalist and stylist, suicide by poisoning.
Quentin Brooks, 86, American Olympic shooter.
Fulton Burley, 84, Canadian performer, heart failure.
Diego Corrales, 29, American world champion boxer, motorcycle accident.
Shirl Conway, 90, American actress.
George Dawson, 45, British politician, Northern Ireland Assembly member, cancer.
Donald Ginsberg, 73, American physicist, melanoma.
Tomasi Kulimoetoke II, 88, Wallisian King of Wallis ('Uvea).
Raffi Lavie, 70, Israeli artist, pancreatic cancer.
Emma Lehmer, 100, Russian-born American mathematician.
Sonny Myers, 83, American professional wrestler.
Octavian Paler, 81, Romanian writer and journalist, heart attack.
Nicholas Worth, 69, American character actor, heart failure.
Yahweh ben Yahweh, 71, American religious cult leader (Nation of Yahweh) and convicted felon, prostate cancer.

8
Philip Craig, 74, American mystery writer.
Velma Dunn, 88, American diver who competed in the 1936 Summer Olympics, stroke.
Abdullah al Faisal, 85, Saudi prince, writer and businessman, after long illness.
David Farquhar, 79, New Zealand composer.
John Henry, 68, British toxicologist, haemorrhage.
René Lamps, 91, French politician.
Jagdish Narain Sapru, 74, Indian former chairman of ITC Limited and BOC India.
Carson Whitsett, 62, American composer, musician and record producer, brain tumor.

9
Donald Alexander, 79, Scottish medical researcher.
Charley Ane, 76, American football player (Detroit Lions), pneumonia.
Alfred Chandler, 88, American economic historian.
Gino Pariani, 79, American soccer player (1950 World Cup), bone cancer.
George Seddon, 80, Australian environmental scholar.
Dwight Wilson, 106, Canadian centenarian, second-to-last surviving World War I veteran.
Philip Workman, 53, American convicted murderer, execution by lethal injection.

10
John Lattimer, 92, American urologist who developed a cure for renal tuberculosis.
Sir Oliver Millar, 84, British Surveyor of the Queen's Pictures (1972–1988) and Director of the Royal Collection (1987–1988).
Robert Oelman, 97, American chief executive of NCR Corporation (1962–1973), co-founder of Wright State University.
Chuck Riley, 66, American voice actor.

11
Norman Frank, 82, American producer and political strategist.
Bernard Gordon, 88, American screenwriter, named on the Hollywood blacklist, cancer.
Stanley Holden, 79, British ballet dancer, complications from heart problems and colon cancer.
Chief Stephen Osita Osadebe, 71, Nigerian Igbo highlife musician.
Malietoa Tanumafili II, 94, Samoan politician, head of state.

12
Mullah Dadullah, 41, Afghan militant, Taliban military commander, shot.
Teddy Infuhr, 70, American child actor.
Kai Johansen, 66, Danish footballer (Greenock Morton F.C. and Rangers), cancer.
Henri Klein, 87, French Olympic athlete.
Edy Vásquez, 23, Honduran footballer, car accident.

13
Alexander Buchanan Campbell, 92, Scottish architect.
*Chen Xiaoxu, 41, Chinese actress (Dream of the Red Mansion) and Buddhist nun, breast cancer.
Mendel Jackson Davis, 64, American politician, U.S. Representative from South Carolina (1971–1981), emphysema.
Gomer Hodge, 63, American baseball player (Cleveland Indians), amyotrophic lateral sclerosis.
Luis María Mendía, 82, Argentine naval officer.
Kate Webb, 64, New Zealand journalist and foreign correspondent, bowel cancer.

14
Orlando Bobo, 33, American-born Canadian football player (Winnipeg Blue Bombers), heart and liver failure.
Ülo Jõgi, 86, Estonian anti-communist.
Sir Edward Jones, 70, British Army general, Black Rod (1996–2001), heart attack.
Nancy McDonald, 72, American politician, member of the Texas House of Representatives (1984–1995), ovarian cancer.
Aaron McMillan, 30, Australian classical pianist, bone cancer.
Jean Saubert, 65, American dual medalist in slalom (1964 Winter Olympics), breast cancer.
Sir Colin St John Wilson, 85, British architect, designer of the British Library.

15
Giorgio Cavaglieri, 95, Italian-born American architect, founder of New York City's urban preservation movement.
Jerry Falwell, 73, American minister, television evangelist, and conservative activist, founder of the Moral Majority, cardiac arrhythmia.
Karen Hess, 88, American culinary historian and author, stroke.
Yolanda King, 51, American activist and actress, daughter and first-born child of civil rights leader Martin Luther King Jr.
Duncan Macrae, 92, British rugby football player, (Scotland Rugby Union Team).
Angus McBride, 76, British illustrator.
Lauren Terrazzano, 39, American journalist, chronicled her battle with cancer, lung cancer.

16
Alphonse "Bois Sec" Ardoin, 91, American creole accordionist.
Dame Mary Douglas, 86, British social anthropologist.
Gohar Gasparyan, 83, Armenian soprano opera singer.
Allan Hird, Sr., 88, Australian footballer and academic, President of Essendon Football Club (1969–1975), Victorian Director-general of Education.
Peter Marner, 71, British cricketer, youngest player to represent the Lancashire County Cricket Club.
Terry Ryan, 60, American writer (The Prize Winner of Defiance, Ohio), cancer.

17
Lloyd Alexander, 83, American fantasy author, including The Chronicles of Prydain, cancer.
Petro Balabuyev, 76, Ukrainian aircraft designer, including world's largest aeroplane, the An-225.
Don Burton, 87, Australian politician, member of the New South Wales Legislative Council (1976–1984).
Egmont Foregger, 84, Austrian jurist, official and politician, severe illness.
John Gonzaga, 74, American football player with the San Francisco 49ers, Dallas Cowboys, Detroit Lions and Denver Broncos.
Kawika Kapahulehua, 76, American captain of the Hokulea's first voyage from Hawaii to Tahiti.
Sir John Nicholls, 80, British air marshal.
Eugen Weber, 82, Romanian-born American historian, pancreatic cancer.
Bill Wight, 85, American MLB pitcher and scout.
Wiktor Zin, 82, Polish architect and graphic artist.

18
Roy De Forest, 77, American artist and professor at University of California, Davis.
Pierre-Gilles de Gennes, 74, French physicist who won the Nobel Prize for Physics in 1991.
Cornelius R. Hager, 93, American educator, President of Asbury University.
Saud Memon, 44, Pakistani businessman implicated in the murder of Daniel Pearl, tuberculosis and meningitis.
Les Schwab, 89, American tire tycoon.
Mika Špiljak, 90, Croatian politician, chairman of the Collective Presidency of Yugoslavia (1983–1984).
Yoyoy Villame, 69, Filipino musician and comedian, heart attack.

19
Derek Cooper, 94, British army officer and refugee campaigner.
Miroslav Deronjić, 52, Bosnian Serb politician and convicted war criminal, natural causes.
Willie Ferguson, 67, South African racing driver.
Jack Findlay, 72, Australian Grand Prix motorcycle racer.
Frank Guida, 84, Italian-born American record producer.
Ron Hall, 43, American football player for the Tampa Bay Buccaneers.
Marian Radke-Yarrow, 89, American researcher in child psychology, leukemia.
Scott Thorkelson, 49, Canadian member of the House of Commons (1988–1993), heart attack.
Michel Visi, 52, Vanuatuan Catholic bishop.
Hans Wollschläger, 72, German author and translator.
Carl Wright, 75, American dancer, comedian and actor, cancer.

20
Bobby Ash, 82, British-born Canadian television host (The Uncle Bobby Show), heart attack.
Dame Jean Herbison, 84, New Zealand academic, first N.Z. female chancellor (University of Canterbury, 1979–1984).
Baruch Kimmerling, 67, Israeli sociologist and historian.
Valentina Leontyeva, 84, Russian television presenter, one of the first television presenters in the Soviet Union.
Sir George Macfarlane, 91, British scientist and engineer.
Tod H. Mikuriya, 73, American psychiatrist and medical marijuana advocate, cancer.
Stanley Miller, 77, American chemist and biologist, known for the Miller–Urey experiment into the origins of life, heart failure.
William Peters, 85, American journalist and documentarian of race issues, Alzheimer's disease.
Guram Sharadze, 66, Georgian philologist and politician, shot.
Norman Von Nida, 93, Australian golfer.
Ben Weisman, 85, American musician and songwriter, wrote nearly 60 songs for singer Elvis Presley, stroke.

21
Clark Adams, 37, American secular humanist leader and activist.
Frank Gay, 86, American businessman, senior corporate aide to Howard Hughes.
Peter Hayes, 58, Australian lawyer.
María Hortensia de Herrera de Lacalle, 98, Uruguayan politician, mother of ex-President Luis Alberto Lacalle.
Bruno Mattei, 75, Italian film director.
Kenneth Sokoloff, 54, American economist who examined factor endowment, liver cancer.
Sakorn Yang-keawsot, 85, Thai puppeteer, lung illness.

22
Fannie Lee Chaney, 84, American civil rights activist.
Frank E. Maestrone, 84, American diplomat, ambassador to Kuwait (1976–1979), infection.
Jef Planckaert, 73, Belgian cyclist.
Pemba Doma Sherpa, 36, Nepali mountaineer, two-time summiter of Mt. Everest, fall from Lhotse.
Art Stevens, 92, American animator, film director and screenwriter (The Fox and the Hound, The Rescuers, The Black Cauldron), heart attack.

23
Clyde Robert Bulla, 93, American children's author.
Kei Kumai, 76, Japanese film director, brain hemorrhage.
Tron Øgrim, 59, Norwegian author and politician.

24
Buddy Childers, 81, American jazz trumpeter, cancer.
Les Harmer, 86, New Zealand cricket umpire.
Bill Johnston, 85, Australian cricketer, member of the 1948 Invincibles.
Philip Mayer Kaiser, 93, American diplomat, ambassador to Senegal and Mauritania, Hungary, and Austria, pneumonia.
Norm Maleng, 68, American prosecutor (King County, Washington), cardiac arrest.
Christopher Newton, 37, American convicted murderer, execution by lethal injection.
Minako Oba, 77, Japanese author.
David Renton, Baron Renton, 98, British politician and aristocrat, oldest peer in the House of Lords.

25
Arwon, 33, New Zealand-born racehorse, longest surviving Melbourne Cup winner, euthanasia.
Laurie Bartram, 49, American actress (Friday the 13th) and ballet dancer, pancreatic cancer.
Victor Firea, 84, Romanian Olympic athlete.
Charles Nelson Reilly, 76, American actor (How to Succeed in Business Without Really Trying, The Ghost & Mrs. Muir, All Dogs Go to Heaven), Tony winner (1962), complications from pneumonia.
Kaspar Schiesser, 91, Swiss Olympic runner.
*Sun Yuanliang, 103, Chinese-born General with the Kuomintang, exiled in Taiwan.
Bartholomew Ulufa'alu, 56, Solomon Islander politician, Prime Minister of the Solomon Islands (1997–2000), after long illness.

26
Sir James Baird, 92, British army general.
James Beck, 77, American art historian, founder of ArtWatch International,.
Gene Gibson, 82, American basketball player and coach (Texas Tech University), complications from surgery.
Marek Krejčí, 26, Slovak footballer, car accident.
Phyllis Sellick, 95, British pianist.
Aubrey Singer, 80, British television executive, head of BBC Two (1974–1978).
Khalil al-Zahawi, 60/61, Iraqi calligrapher, shot.

27
Ron Archer, 73, Australian Test cricketer, lung cancer.
Edward Behr, 81, British journalist and author.
Sam Garrison, 65, American lawyer, defended President Richard Nixon in impeachment hearings in 1974, leukemia.
Marquise Hill, 24, American football player (New England Patriots), drowning.
Jack Kerr, 96, New Zealand cricket player, Chairman and President of New Zealand Cricket.
Wiley Mayne, 90, American politician, U.S. Representative from Iowa (1966–1974), cardiopulmonary incident.
Howard Porter, 58, American basketball player (Bulls, Knicks, Pistons), injuries sustained from beating.
Izumi Sakai, 40, Japanese singer (Zard), cerebral contusion.
Percy Sonn, 57, South African cricket player, President of the International Cricket Council, complications after surgery.
G. Srinivasan, 48, Indian film producer, brother of director Mani Ratnam, fall into gorge.
Gretchen Wyler, 75, American actress and animal rights activist, complications of breast cancer.
Ed Yost, 87, American inventor of the modern hot air balloon.

28
Barbara Cox Anthony, 84, American heiress, after long illness.
Harold C. Helgeson, 75, American geochemist, lung cancer.
Jörg Immendorff, 61, German painter, amyotrophic lateral sclerosis.
Phyllis Koehn, 84, American baseball player (All-American Girls Professional Baseball League).
David Lane, 68, American white supremacist leader and author.
John Macquarrie, 87, British theologian, Lady Margaret Professor of Divinity at Oxford (1970–1986).
Toshikatsu Matsuoka, 62, Japanese politician, Minister of Agriculture, suicide by hanging.
Parren Mitchell, 85, American politician, U.S. Representative from Maryland (1971–1987), co-founder of Congressional Black Caucus, pneumonia.
Ethel Mutharika, 63, Zimbabwe-born First Lady of Malawi, cancer.

29
Dave Balon, 68, Canadian ice hockey player, multiple sclerosis.
Tony Bastable, 62, British television presenter (Magpie), DJ and independent producer, pneumonia.
Dame Lois Browne-Evans, 79, Bermudian politician.
Donald Johanos, 79, American conductor.
Norman Kaye, 80, Australian actor and musician, Alzheimer's disease.
Posteal Laskey Jr., 69, American convicted murderer, commonly believed to be the serial killer called the "Cincinnati Strangler".
Tahir Mirza, 70, Pakistani journalist and former editor of Dawn, lung cancer.
Folole Muliaga, 44, Samoan–NZ teacher whose oxygen machine failed after power cut for unpaid account, heart and lung disease.
Michael Seaton, 84, British astronomer and physicist.
Wallace Seawell, 90, American photographer and filmmaker, age-related causes.
John Stanning junior, 87, English cricketer.

30
Jean-Claude Brialy, 74, French actor and director, cancer.
Kieran Carey, 74, Irish hurler.
Mark Harris, 84, American author (Bang the Drum Slowly), Alzheimer's disease.
Preston Martin, 83, American banker, Deputy Chairman of the Federal Reserve Board (1982–1986), cancer.
William Morris Meredith, Jr., 88, American poet and Pulitzer Prize winner.
Yevgeni Mishakov, 66, Russian ice hockey player.

31
George Bragg, 81, American conductor and founder of the Texas Boys Choir.
Norman Fletcher, 89, American architect.
Clifford Scott Green, 84, American jurist, Federal Court judge.
David J. Lawson, 77, American minister, bishop of the United Methodist Church, after long illness.
Fathia Nkrumah, 75, Egyptian–born Ghanaian First Lady, after long illness.
Charles Remington, 85, American zoologist, known for studies of butterflies and moths.
Alexander Tubelsky, 66, Russian academic, President of Association of Democratic Schools, stroke.
Jim Williams, 92, American basketball coach (Colorado State University).

References

2007-05
 05